Ravindra Rupasena (Sinhala:රවීන්ද්‍ර රූපසේන) was an actor in Sri Lankan cinema.

Early life and education
Rupasena was educated at Nalanda College Colombo

Rupasena was married to fellow popular actress, Leena de Silva from 11 November 1960 to his death in 1978. He met Leena during his maiden film Ahankara Sthree and then the couple appeared in many film together, including Surathali, Sohoyuro, Sundara Birinda, Suneetha and Nalagana. The couple has one son and one daughter. Rupasena died on 15 April 1978 by a sudden heart attack at the age of 49.

Career
Rupasena made his maiden cinematic appearance through the 1954 film Ahankara Sthree directed by	A.B. Raja. Then he continued to act in many popular movies including, Surathali, Sundara Birinda and Sujage Rahasa. He made his final cinema appearance in 1967 with the film Amathala Unada directed by D.M. Daas.

Filmography

References

External links
 

 

Sinhalese male actors
Sri Lankan male film actors
Sri Lankan Buddhists
Alumni of Nalanda College, Colombo
1978 deaths
1929 births